Cruzeiro, generally the Portuguese language term for a large cross, may refer to:

Places

Brazil 
 Cruzeiro, Belo Horizonte, a neighborhood of Belo Horizonte, near Savassi
 Cruzeiro, Federal District, an administrative region of the Federal District
 Cruzeiro, São Paulo, a city in the state of São Paulo, Brazil

Portugal 
 , a locality in Olhalvo, Alenquer

Football clubs
 Cruzeiro Esporte Clube, a Brazilian football team from the city of Belo Horizonte, Minas Gerais
 Cruzeiro Esporte Clube (PB), a Brazilian football team from the city of Itaporanga, Paraíba
 Cruzeiro Esporte Clube (RO), a Brazilian football team from the city of Porto Velho, Rondônia
 Cruzeiro Futebol Clube (BA), a Brazilian football team from the city of Cruz das Almas, Bahia
 Esporte Clube Cruzeiro, a Brazilian football team from the state of Rio Grande do Sul

Other uses
 Ana Bela Cruzeiro (born 1957), Portuguese and Swiss mathematician
 O Cruzeiro, or simply Cruzeiro, a Brazilian magazine
 Brazilian cruzeiro (disambiguation), former currency of Brazil
 Serviços Aéreos Cruzeiro do Sul, or simply Cruzeiro, a defunct airline of Brazil

See also